Graph may refer to:

Mathematics
Graph (discrete mathematics), a structure made of vertices and edges
Graph theory, the study of such graphs and their properties
Graph (topology), a topological space resembling a graph in the sense of discrete mathematics
Graph of a function
Graph of a relation
Graph paper
Chart, a means of representing data (also called a graph)

Computing
Graph (abstract data type), an abstract data type representing relations or connections
graph (Unix), Unix command-line utility
Conceptual graph, a model for knowledge representation and reasoning

Other uses
HMS Graph, a submarine of the UK Royal Navy

See also
Complex network
Graf
Graff (disambiguation)
Graph database
Grapheme, in linguistics
Graphemics
Graphic (disambiguation)
-graphy (suffix from the Greek for "describe," "write" or "draw")
List of information graphics software
Statistical graphics